T.E.K. United FC is an Irish association football club based in Blackrock, Dublin. Their senior men's team play in the Leinster Senior League Senior Division and women's team play in the Dublin Women's Soccer League . They also regularly compete in the FAI Cup, the FAI Intermediate Cup, the FAI Junior Cup and the Leinster Senior Cup.

History
T.E.K. United were formed in 1946. The club's best years were undoubtedly in the 1960s and 1970s when they routinely featured in the Leinster Senior League Senior Division, Ireland's third tier, winning the division on six separate occasions.

The cub has reached the final of the FAI Intermediate Cup on five separate occasions (1963–64, 1964–65, 1971–72, 1973–74, and 1988–89), winning it twice, in 1965 against Glasheen and 1989 against St James's Gate. On Sunday 12 May 1963 they were also crowned FAI Junior Cup champions at Dalymount Park, beating Blackrock of Cork 3–1. Between 1964 and 1967, the club were managed by former Everton forward and Ireland international, Peter Farrell.

Today, the club plays in the Senior Division - 1A Sunday and the Senior 1 Sunday divisions of the Leinster Senior League. On 4 August 2020 the club announced that former Bohemians goalkeeper, Andy McNulty, had been appointed as their new First Team Manager.

Origin of name
T.E.K's name, as detailed by their crest, is an allusion to the 1882 Battle of Tell El Kebir, in which the British Army under Anglo-Irish General Garnet Wolseley, 1st Viscount Wolseley recorded a resounding victory over Khedivate of Egypt forces of Ahmed ʻUrabi in what is now Egypt. While the club doesn't directly take its name from the battle, its name is linked to that of a nearby local dairy company, Sutton's T.E.K. Dairy, whose founder had fought at the battle. More direct references to the battle can be seen in T.E.K's badge, which features an image of the Spinx as well as the year 1882 and the words 'EGYPT' and 'TEL-EL-KEBIR'.

Notable former players
  Pat Devlin
  Nicky Broujos

Notable former managers
  Peter Farrell

Honours
Leinster Senior Division: 6
 1964–1965, 1965–1966, 1968–1969, 1970–1971, 1974–1975, 1977–1978
Leinster Senior Division 1A: 1
 2014-15
FAI Intermediate Cup: 2
 1964–65, 1988–89
FAI Junior Cup: 1
 1962-63

References

Leinster Senior League (association football) clubs
Association football clubs in Dublin (city)
1885 establishments in Ireland
Association football clubs established in 1946
Former Athletic Union League (Dublin) clubs
'Urabi revolt